Šokac may refer to:

 Šokac dialect
 Šokci

See also
 Sokač, a Croatian surname